Natalia Mikhailovna Afremova (born 14 November 1998) is a Russian BMX (bicycle motocross) cyclist.

She came fifth in the European championships in July 2021.
She was selected in the Russian Olympic Committee team for the Cycling at the 2020 Summer Olympics – Women's BMX racing.

References

External links
 
 
 
 
 

1998 births
Living people
BMX riders
Russian female cyclists
Olympic cyclists of Russia
Cyclists at the 2020 Summer Olympics
Sportspeople from Penza